Branch is a masculine given name borne by:

 Branch Rickey (1881–1965), American baseball executive
 Branch Rickey Jr. (1914–1961), American baseball executive
 Branch Rickey III (born 1945), American baseball executive
 Branch Russell (1895–1959), American baseball player

English-language masculine given names